Mamma Cannes is a town in Saint Andrew Parish, Grenada.  It is located on the eastern coast of the island.

References 

Populated places in Grenada
Saint Andrew Parish, Grenada